Batinci is the second-largest village in the municipality of Studeničani, North Macedonia.

Demographics
According to the 2021 census, the village had a total of 7.267 inhabitants. Ethnic groups in the village include:

Albanians 4.473
Bosniaks 1.625
Turks 616
Macedonians 17
Vlachs 2
Serbs 2
Others 532

References

Villages in Studeničani Municipality
Albanian communities in North Macedonia